Platyspermation is a genus of plant in family Alseuosmiaceae. The genus contains a single species, Platyspermation crassifolium, and is endemic to New Caledonia.

References

Alseuosmiaceae
Endemic flora of New Caledonia
Near threatened plants
Near threatened biota of Oceania
Monotypic Asterales genera
Taxonomy articles created by Polbot